Qeshlaq-e Qarah Kakil Ayaz (also Romanized as Qeshlāq-e Qarah Kakīl Āyāz) is a village in Qeshlaq-e Jonubi Rural District, Qeshlaq Dasht District, Bileh Savar County, Ardabil Province, Iran. At the 2006 census, its population was 26, in 6 families.

References 

Populated places in Bileh Savar County
Towns and villages in Bileh Savar County